The Egyptian Renaissance Party  is a Sufi political party in Egypt.

See also
Politics of Egypt
List of political parties in Egypt

References

Islamic political parties in Egypt
Political parties in Egypt
Political parties with year of establishment missing
Sufism